Alcantara, officially the Municipality of Alcantara,  is a 5th class municipality in the province of Romblon, Philippines. According to the 2020 census, it has a population of 17,171 people.

History
Alcantara was first established in 1730 as La Lauan, a barrio of Looc town by migrants from Panay Island led by Don Ciriaco Alcantara. In 1855, the barrio was annexed from Looc and converted into a pueblo or town.  However, in 1868, it was abolished and annexed as a barrio of Guintigui-an town (renamed Badajoz, now San Agustin) after a reorganization of municipalities resulting from the creation of Romblon province.

In 1870, due to continuous intimidation from Muslim pirates, as well as the rugged terrain, the residents of La Lauan led by a certain Gaspar Guevarra transferred from its former site in Daan Banwa (or Old Town) and established a new barrio down south called Alcantara, after Don Ciriaco Alcantara. In 1885, it was annexed back as a barrio of Looc, and would remain so until after World War II.

Alcantara was elevated to municipality status on 21 March 1961 by virtue of Executive Order 427 signed by then President Carlos P. Garcia.

Geography
Alcantara lies in the southeast portion of Tablas Island. It is bounded to the north by the municipality of Santa Maria, to the west by Looc, to the south by Santa Fe, and to the east by the Sibuyan Sea. Most of Alcantara lies in plains along the coast with mountains in the interior to the west.

Climate

Barangays
Alcantara is politically subdivided into 12 barangays:

Demographics

According to the 2015 census, it has a population of 16,351 people.  Just like in the neighboring municipality of Santa Maria, majority of the population speaks the Alcantaranon variant of Inunhan or Onhan where /l/ is used instead of /r/.

Economy

Farming and fishing are the major sources of income in Alcantara. Fishing grounds along the coastal areas of the municipality abound with mackerel, sea bass, tuna, anchovies, tanguigue, sapsap, and commercial tropical fish for aquariums. Forest products such as nito and huwag are abundant in some of its barangays.

Government

Pursuant to Chapter II, Title II, Book III of Republic Act 7160 or the Local Government Code of 1991, the municipal government is composed of a mayor (alkalde), a vice mayor (bise alkalde) and members (kagawad) of the legislative branch Sangguniang Bayan alongside a secretary to the said legislature, all of which are elected to a three-year term and are eligible to run for three consecutive terms.

Tourism

Because much of Alcantara's interior is made up of mountains covered in lush tropical rainforest, it is being promoted as a hiking destination for backpackers. There are freshwater springs located in Camili, Calogonsao, Bonlao, San Isidro, and Madalag which tourists can enjoy. Other tourist spots in Alcantara include:

Walls view: Located in mountains and seas. The view offers fantastic viewing deck few meters above sea level. Needs a bit of a hiking and hard trails which attracts health conscious enthusiast.
Aglicay Beach Resort: This beach has a scenic view. With palm-fringed white sand and clear blue waters.
Binay-we Beach: This place has its highest peak of popularity in the 1980s and is located 1.2 km from the town proper of Alcantara. It is located in a small cove with fine white sand and calm waters the whole year around. It is partly shielded from the public's prying eyes by huge boulders.
Saginyogan: It is a local annual festival every March alongside the founding celebration of the Municipality of Alcantara.
Christmas lighting: Weeks before Christmas, the Municipality of Alcantara is building a massive Christmas tree in the main plaza and the lighting of the tree signifies the start of the festive season. People from other towns flock to witness such a once a year event.

Local delicacies

Sarsa: Featured in television and digital media, this little treat serves as more of an appetizer. It is made up of river prawns, mixed with grated coconut and cut local chilies wrapped in coconut leaves and boiled to perfection with coconut cream.

Infrastructure

Utilities
The Tablas Island Electric Cooperative (TIECO) and NAPOCOR supply 57.75 percent of the 2,740 households Alcantara with electricity. As for water supply, Alcantara has one irrigation service with 37 service areas and three community irrigation with 75 service areas. Potable water supply comes from jet pumps, open wells, artesian wells and springs.

Transportation and communication
Alcantara is home to Romblon's sole airport in Barangay Tugdan. Cebu Pacific operates four flights a week to Romblon via the airport. Visitors going to Alcantara can reach Tablas Island via Odiongan where RORO vessels from Manila, Batangas City, and Roxas, Oriental Mindoro regularly stop by. From Odiongan, Alcantara is just an hour or two by jeepney.

People in the town take public utility jeepneys (PUJ), pedicabs, tricycles, and motorcycles to and from neighboring towns. The Tablas Circumferential Road connects Alcantara with neighboring municipalities. PLDT, Smart, and Globe provide landline and cellular phone services in the municipality.

Education
Romblon National Institute of Technology (RNIT) is located in Poblacion, formerly Alcantara National Trade School. The town also has three public high schools offering quality education under the Department of Education.

References

External links

 Alcantara Profile at PhilAtlas.com
 Alcantara, Romblon Profile - Cities and Municipalities Competitive Index
 Municipality of Alcantara. Official Website of the Province of Romblon.
 [ Philippine Standard Geographic Code]
 Philippine Census Information
 Local Governance Performance Management System

Municipalities of Romblon